This list contains general information about graphics processing units (GPUs) and video cards from Nvidia, based on official specifications. In addition some Nvidia motherboards come with integrated onboard GPUs. Limited/Special/Collectors' Editions or AIB versions are not included.

Field explanations
The fields in the table listed below describe the following:

 Model – The marketing name for the processor, assigned by The Nvidia.
 Launch – Date of release for the processor.
 Code name – The internal engineering codename for the processor (typically designated by an NVXY name and later GXY where X is the series number and Y is the schedule of the project for that generation).
 Fab – Fabrication process. Average feature size of components of the processor.
 Bus interface – Bus by which the graphics processor is attached to the system (typically an expansion slot, such as PCI, AGP, or PCI-Express).
 Memory – The amount of graphics memory available to the processor.
 SM Count – Number of streaming multiprocessors.
 Core clock – The factory core clock frequency; while some manufacturers adjust clocks lower and higher, this number will always be the reference clocks used by Nvidia.
 Memory clock – The factory effective memory clock frequency (while some manufacturers adjust clocks lower and higher, this number will always be the reference clocks used by Nvidia). All DDR/GDDR memories operate at half this frequency, except for GDDR5, which operates at one quarter of this frequency.
 Core config – The layout of the graphics pipeline, in terms of functional units. Over time the number, type, and variety of functional units in the GPU core has changed significantly; before each section in the list there is an explanation as to what functional units are present in each generation of processors. In later models, shaders are integrated into a unified shader architecture, where any one shader can perform any of the functions listed.
 Fillrate – Maximum theoretical fill rate in textured pixels per second. This number is generally used as a maximum throughput number for the GPU and generally, a higher fill rate corresponds to a more powerful (and faster) GPU.
 Memory subsection
Bandwidth – Maximum theoretical bandwidth for the processor at factory clock with factory bus width. GHz = 10 Hz.
 Bus type – Type of memory bus or buses used.
 Bus width – Maximum bit width of the memory bus or buses used. This will always be a factory bus width.
 API support section
Direct3D – Maximum version of Direct3D fully supported.
 OpenGL – Maximum version of OpenGL fully supported.
OpenCL – Maximum version of OpenCL fully supported.
Vulkan – Maximum version of Vulkan fully supported.
 Features – Added features that are not standard as a part of the two graphics libraries.

Desktop GPUs

Pre-GeForce

GeForce 256 series

 All models are made via TSMC 220 nm fabrication process
 All models support Direct3D 7.0 and OpenGL 1.2
 All models support hardware Transform and Lighting (T&L) and Cube Environment Mapping

GeForce2 series

 All models support Direct3D 7 and OpenGL 1.2
 All models support TwinView Dual-Display Architecture, Second Generation Transform and Lighting (T&L), Nvidia Shading Rasterizer (NSR), High-Definition Video Processor (HDVP)
 GeForce2 MX models support Digital Vibrance Control (DVC)

GeForce3 series

 All models are made via TSMC 150 nm fabrication process
 All models support Direct3D 8.0 and OpenGL 1.3
 All models support 3D Textures, Lightspeed Memory Architecture (LMA), nFiniteFX Engine, Shadow Buffers

GeForce4 series

 All models are manufactured via TSMC 150 nm manufacturing process
 All models support Accuview Antialiasing (AA), Lightspeed Memory Architecture II (LMA II), nView

GeForce FX (5xxx) series

 All models support Direct3D 9.0a and OpenGL 1.5 (2.1 (software) with latest drivers)
 The GeForce FX series runs vertex shaders in an array

GeForce 6 (6xxx) series

 All models support Direct3D 9.0c and OpenGL 2.1
 All models support Transparency AA (starting with version 91.47 of the ForceWare drivers) and PureVideo

Features

GeForce 7 (7xxx) series

 All models support Direct3D 9.0c and OpenGL 2.1
 All models support Transparency AA (starting with version 91.47 of the ForceWare drivers)

Features

GeForce 8 (8xxx) series

 All models support coverage sample anti-aliasing, angle-independent anisotropic filtering, and 128-bit OpenEXR HDR.

Features
 Compute Capability 1.1: has support for Atomic functions, which are used to write thread-safe programs.
 Compute Capability 1.2: for details see CUDA

GeForce 9 (9xxx) series

 All models support Coverage Sample Anti-Aliasing, Angle-Independent Anisotropic Filtering, 128-bit OpenEXR HDR

Features
 Compute Capability: 1.1 has support for Atomic functions, which are used to write thread-safe programs.

GeForce 100 series

GeForce 200 series

 All models support Coverage Sample Anti-Aliasing, Angle-Independent Anisotropic Filtering, 240-bit OpenEXR HDR

Features
 Compute Capability: 1.1 (G92 [GTS250] GPU)
 Compute Capability: 1.2 (GT215, GT216, GT218 GPUs)
 Compute Capability: 1.3 has double precision support for use in GPGPU applications. (GT200a/b GPUs only)

GeForce 300 series

 All models support the following API levels: Direct3D 10.1 and OpenGL 3.3

GeForce 400 series

 All cards have a PCIe 2.0 x16 Bus interface.
 The base requirement for Vulkan 1.0 in terms of hardware features was OpenGL ES 3.1 which is a subset of OpenGL 4.3, which is supported on all Fermi and newer cards.
 Memory bandwidths stated in the following table refer to Nvidia reference designs. Actual bandwidth can be higher or lower depending on the maker of the graphic board.

GeForce 500 series

GeForce 600 series

 Add NVENC on GTX cards
 Several 600 series cards are rebranded 400 or 500 series cards.

GeForce 700 series 

The GeForce 700 series for desktop. The GM107-chips are Maxwell-based, the GKxxx-chips Kepler.

 Improve NVENC

GeForce 900 series

 All models support the following APIs: Direct3D 12_1, OpenGL 4.6, OpenCL 3.0 and Vulkan 1.3 and CUDA 5.2
Improve NVENC (YUV4:4:4, predictive lossless encoding).
Add H265 hardware support on GM20x
GM108 does not have NVENC hardware encoder support.

GeForce 10 series

 Supported display standards: DP 1.4 (no DSC), HDMI 2.0b, Dual-link DVI
 Supported APIs: Direct3D 12 (12_1), OpenGL 4.6, OpenCL 3.0, Vulkan 1.3 and CUDA 6.1
 Improved NVENC (HEVC Main10, decode 8K30, etc.)

Volta series

 Supported APIs: Direct3D 12 (12_1), OpenGL 4.6, OpenCL 3.0, Vulkan 1.3 and CUDA 7.0

GeForce 16 series

 Supported APIs: Direct3D 12 (feature level 12_1), OpenGL 4.6, OpenCL 3.0, Vulkan 1.3 and CUDA 7.5
 NVENC 6th generation (B-frame, etc.)
 TU117 only supports Volta NVENC (5th generation)

GeForce 20 series

 Supported APIs: Direct3D 12 Ultimate (12_2), OpenGL 4.6, OpenCL 3.0, Vulkan 1.3 and CUDA 7.5
 Unlike previous generations the RTX Non-Super (RTX 2070, RTX 2080, RTX 2080 Ti) Founders Edition cards no longer have reference clocks, but are "Factory-OC". However, RTX Supers (RTX 2060 Super, RTX 2070 Super, and RTX 2080 Super) Founders Edition are reference clocks.
 NVENC 6th generation (B-frame, etc.)

GeForce 30 series 

 Supported APIs: Direct3D 12 Ultimate (12_2), OpenGL 4.6, OpenCL 3.0, Vulkan 1.3 and CUDA 8.6
 Supported display connections: HDMI 2.1, DisplayPort 1.4a
 NVENC 7th generation
 Tensor core 3rd gen
 RT core 2nd gen
 RTX IO
 Improved NVDEC with AV1 decode
 NVIDIA DLSS 2.0

GeForce 40 series 

Supported APIs: Direct3D 12 Ultimate (12_2), OpenGL 4.6, OpenCL 3.0, Vulkan 1.3 and CUDA 8.9
Supported display connections: HDMI 2.1, DisplayPort 1.4a
Tensor core 4th gen
RT core 3rd gen
NVIDIA DLSS 3
No NVLink support, Multi-GPU over PCIe 5.0

Mobile GPUs
Mobile GPUs are either soldered to the mainboard or to some Mobile PCI Express Module (MXM).

GeForce2 Go series
 All models are manufactured with a 180 nm manufacturing process
 All models support Direct3D 7.0 and OpenGL 1.2
Celsius (microarchitecture)

GeForce4 Go series
 All models are made via 150 nm fabrication process

GeForce FX Go 5 (Go 5xxx) series
The GeForce FX Go 5 series for notebooks architecture.
 1 Vertex shaders: pixel shaders: texture mapping units: render output units
 * The GeForce FX series runs vertex shaders in an array
 ** GeForce FX series has limited OpenGL 2.1 support(with the last Windows XP driver released for it, 175.19).
Rankine (microarchitecture)

GeForce Go 6 (Go 6xxx) series
 All models support Direct3D 9.0c and OpenGL 2.1
Curie (microarchitecture)

 1 Pixel shaders: vertex shaders: texture mapping units: render output units

GeForce Go 7 (Go 7xxx) series
The GeForce Go 7 series for notebooks architecture.
 1 Vertex shaders: pixel shaders: texture mapping units: render output units
 2 Graphics card supports TurboCache, memory size entries in bold indicate total memory (graphics + system RAM), otherwise entries are graphics RAM only
Curie (microarchitecture)

GeForce 8M (8xxxM) series
The GeForce 8M series for notebooks architecture Tesla.
 1 Unified shaders: texture mapping units: render output units

GeForce 9M (9xxxM) series
The GeForce 9M series for notebooks architecture. Tesla (microarchitecture)
 1 Unified shaders: texture mapping units: render output units

GeForce 100M (1xxM) series
The GeForce 100M series for notebooks architecture. Tesla (microarchitecture) (103M, 105M, 110M, 130M are rebranded GPU i.e. using the same GPU cores of previous generation, 9M, with promised optimisation on other features)
 1 Unified shaders: texture mapping units: render output units

GeForce 200M (2xxM) series
The GeForce 200M series is a graphics processor architecture for notebooks, Tesla (microarchitecture)
 1 Unified shaders: texture mapping units: render output units

GeForce 300M (3xxM) series
The GeForce 300M series for notebooks architecture, Tesla (microarchitecture)
 1 Unified shaders: texture mapping units: render output units
 2 To calculate the processing power see Tesla (microarchitecture)#Performance.

GeForce 400M (4xxM) series
The GeForce 400M series for notebooks architecture, Fermi (microarchitecture)

 1 Unified shaders: texture mapping units: render output units
 2 To calculate the processing power see Fermi (microarchitecture)#Performance.
 3 Each SM in the GF100 also contains 4 texture address units and 16 texture filtering units. Total for the full GF100 64 texture address units and 256 texture filtering units. Each SM in the GF104/106/108 architecture contains 8 texture filtering units for every texture address unit. The complete GF104 die contains 64 texture address units and 512 texture filtering units, the complete GF106 die contains 32 texture address units and 256 texture filtering units and the complete GF108 die contains 16 texture address units and 128 texture filtering units.

GeForce 500M (5xxM) series
The GeForce 500M series for notebooks architecture.

 1 Unified shaders: texture mapping units: render output units
 2 On Some Dell XPS17

GeForce 600M (6xxM) series

The GeForce 600M series for notebooks architecture. The processing power is obtained by multiplying shader clock speed, the number of cores, and how many instructions the cores can perform per cycle.

 1 Unified shaders: texture mapping units: render output units
Non GTX Graphics, lack support NVENC

GeForce 700M (7xxM) series

The GeForce 700M series for notebooks architecture. The processing power is obtained by multiplying shader clock speed, the number of cores, and how many instructions the cores can perform per cycle.

 1 Unified shaders: texture mapping units: render output units
Non GTX Graphics, lack support NVENC

GeForce 800M (8xxM) series

The GeForce 800M series for notebooks architecture. The processing power is obtained by multiplying shader clock speed, the number of cores, and how many instructions the cores can perform per cycle.

 1 Unified shaders: texture mapping units: render output units
810M to 845M Graphics lack support NVENC

GeForce 900M (9xxM) series

The GeForce 900M series for notebooks architecture. The processing power is obtained by multiplying shader clock speed, the number of cores, and how many instructions the cores can perform per cycle.

 1 Unified shaders: texture mapping units: render output units
920M to 940M Graphics lack support NVENC

GeForce 10 series

 Unified shaders: texture mapping units: render output units
Improve NVENC (Better support H265, VP9...)
MX Graphics lack support NVENC

GeForce 16 series

 Supported APIs: Direct3D 12 (12_1), OpenGL 4.6, OpenCL 3.0, Vulkan 1.3 and CUDA 7.5, improve NVENC
No SLI, no TensorCore and no Raytracing hardware acceleration.

GeForce 20 series

 Supported APIs: Direct3D 12 (12_2), OpenGL 4.6, OpenCL 3.0, Vulkan 1.3 and CUDA 7.5, improve NVENC (Support B-Frame on H265...)
 MX Graphics lack NVENC and they are based on Pascal architecture.
Add TensorCore and Ray tracing hardware acceleration, RTX IO (Only on RTX cards)
Nvidia DLSS

GeForce 30 series

 Supported APIs: Direct3D 12 Ultimate (12_2), OpenGL 4.6, OpenCL 3.0, Vulkan 1.3 and CUDA 8.6
Tensor core 3rd gen
RT core 2nd gen
RTX IO
Improve NVDEC (Add AV1)

GeForce 40 series 

Supported APIs: Direct3D 12 Ultimate (12_2), OpenGL 4.6, OpenCL 3.0, Vulkan 1.3 and CUDA 8.9
Tensor core 4th gen
RT core 3rd gen
DLSS 3 (Super Resolution + Frame Generation) 
SER

GeForce MX series

Workstation GPUs

Quadro

 1 Vertex shaders: pixel shaders: texture mapping units: render output units

Quadro FX series

 1 Vertex shaders: pixel shaders: texture mapping units: render output units

Quadro FX (x300) series

 1 Vertex shaders: pixel shaders: texture mapping units: render output units

Quadro FX (x400) series

 1 Vertex shaders: pixel shaders: texture mapping units: render output units

Quadro FX (x500) series

 1 Vertex shaders: pixel shaders: texture mapping units: render output units

Quadro FX (x600) series

 1 Vertex shaders: pixel shaders: texture mapping units: render output units
 2 Unified shaders: texture mapping units: render output units

Quadro FX (x700) series

 1Unified shaders: texture mapping units: render output units

Quadro FX (x800) series

 1Unified shaders: texture mapping units: render output units

Quadro x000 series

 1 Unified shaders: texture mapping units: render output units
 4 Each SM in the Fermi architecture contains 4 texture filtering units for every texture address unit. Total for the full GF100 64 texture address units and 256 texture filtering units

Quadro Kxxx series

 1Unified shaders: texture mapping units: render output units

Quadro Mxxx series

 1Unified shaders: texture mapping units: render output units: streaming multiprocessors

Quadro Pxxx series

 1Unified shaders: texture mapping units: render output units: streaming multiprocessors

Quadro GVxxx series

 1 Unified shaders: texture mapping units: render output units: streaming multiprocessors: tensor cores

Quadro Tx00/Tx000 series 

 1 Unified shaders: texture mapping units: render output units: streaming multiprocessors

Quadro RTX x000 series 

 1 Unified shaders: texture mapping units: render output units: streaming multiprocessors: tensor cores

RTX Ax000 series

 1 Unified shaders: texture mapping units: render output units: streaming multiprocessors: tensor cores

Quadro NVS

 1 Vertex shaders: pixel shaders: texture mapping units: render output units
 2 Unified shaders: texture mapping units: render output units
 * NV31, NV34 and NV36 are 2x2 pipeline designs if running vertex shader, otherwise they are 4x1 pipeline designs.

Mobile Workstation GPUs

Quadro Go (GL) & Quadro FX Go series

Early mobile Quadro chips based on the GeForce2 Go up to GeForce Go 6800. Precise specifications on these old mobile workstation chips are very hard to find, and conflicting between Nvidia press releases and product lineups in GPU databases like TechPowerUp's GPUDB.

 1 Vertex shaders: pixel shaders: texture mapping units: render output units
 2 Unified shaders: texture mapping units: render output units

Quadro FX (x500M) series
GeForce 7-Series based.

 1 Vertex shaders: pixel shaders: texture mapping units: render output units

Quadro FX (x600M) series
GeForce 8-Series (except FX 560M and FX 3600M) based. First Quadro Mobile line to support DirectX 10.

 1Unified shaders: texture mapping units: render output units

Quadro FX (x700M) series

 1Unified shaders: texture mapping units: render output units

Quadro FX (x800M) series
The last DirectX 10 based Quadro mobile cards.

1Unified shaders: texture mapping units: render output units

Quadro (xxxxM) series

 1 Unified shaders: texture mapping units: render output units
 2 Each SM in the Fermi architecture contains 4 texture filtering units for every texture address unit

Quadro (Kx000M) series

 1Unified shaders: texture mapping units: render output units

Quadro (Kx100M) series

 1Unified shaders: texture mapping units: render output units

Quadro (Kx200M) series

 1Unified shaders: texture mapping units: render output units

Quadro (Mx000M) series

 1Unified shaders: texture mapping units: render output units

Quadro (Mx200) series

 1Unified shaders: texture mapping units: render output units

Quadro (Mx500) series

 1Unified shaders: texture mapping units: render output units

Quadro (Px000) series

 1Unified shaders: texture mapping units: render output units: streaming multiprocessors

Quadro (Px200) series

 1Unified shaders: texture mapping units: render output units: streaming multiprocessors

Quadro RTX / T x000 series 

 1 Unified shaders: texture mapping units: render output units: streaming multiprocessors: tensor cores (or FP16 Cores in T x000 Series)

RTX Ax000 series 

 1 Unified shaders: texture mapping units: render output units: streaming multiprocessors: tensor cores

Mobility Quadro NVS series

 1 Vertex shaders: pixel shaders: texture mapping units: render output units
 2 Unified shaders: texture mapping units: render output units

Mobility NVS series

 1Unified shaders: texture mapping units: render output units

Tegra GPU

Data Center GPUs

GRID

 Data from GRID GPUS

Tesla

Console GPUs

 1 Pixel shaders: vertex shaders: texture mapping units: render output units
 2 Unified shaders: Texture mapping units : Render output units

See also
 nouveau (software)
 Scalable Link Interface (SLI)
 TurboCache
 Tegra
 Apple M1
 CUDA
Nvidia NVDEC
Nvidia NVENC
Qualcomm Adreno
ARM Mali
 Comparison of Nvidia nForce chipsets
 List of AMD graphics processing units
 List of Intel graphics processing units
 List of eponyms of Nvidia GPU microarchitectures
 Imageon by ATI (Now AMD)

References

External links
 OpenGL 2.0 support on Nvidia GPUs (PDF document)
 Release Notes for Nvidia OpenGL Shading Language Support (PDF document)

Computing comparisons
 
Nvidia
Lists of microprocessors